Mullaghbawn Cúchulainn's Gaelic Football Club is a GAA club in Mullaghbawn, southern County Armagh, Northern Ireland. It is part of Armagh GAA, and plays at Chucullain Park. It plays Gaelic football in the Armagh Senior Football Championship.

History
A team from Mullaghbawn lost the 1917 Armagh Senior championship final (played in March 1918) to Young Irelands of Armagh.

The club was founded in 1934, winning the Junior county league in 1938 and Junior championship in 1942. Also in 1942, Mullaghbawn reached the Senior final, losing to Armagh St Malachy's.

The Mullaghbawn club ceased to exist in 1947 but was reformed some years later. It won the Junior championship in 1960, and the club's first Senior title in 1964, beating Wolfe Tone. Mullaghbawn reached the final of the Armagh Intermediate championship in 1968, losing heavily to St Peter's GAC, Lurgan. Two years later it lost the IFC by a single point to Madden.

The club reformed again in 1979. In that year it again made it to the IFC final, losing to St Patrick's, Cullyhanna. After winning the Junior title in 1986, Mullaghbawn returned to the Intermediate level. Further IFC final losses came in 1988, again to Cullyhanna, and 1989, to Dromintee, but in 1992 Mullaghbawn at last won the IFC, beating Middletown Eoghan Rua by 2–8 to 1–5.

Promoted to the Senior ranks again, the Cúchulainns lost the 1994 SFC final to Lurgan's Clan na Gael, but its high point to date came in 1995, when it beat Armagh Harps in the county final, and went on to win the Ulster Senior Club championship, defeating Bailieboro Shamrocks of Cavan. Since then Mullaghbawn has appeared in the 1997 and 2004 SFC finals, falling on both occasions to Crossmaglen.

Notable players
 Kieran McGeeney, Armagh player 1992–2007, captained Armagh to All-Ireland title in 2002, winner of three All Stars and 2002 Footballer of the Year, subsequently manager of Kildare
 Justin McNulty, Armagh player 1995–2005, subsequently manager of Laois
 Enda McNulty, Armagh player 1996–2010, All Star 2002 
 Benny Tierney, former Armagh goalkeeper, member of 2002 All-Ireland team

Roll of honour
Ulster Senior Club Football Championship (1)
 1995
 Armagh Senior Football Championship (2)
1964, 1995
 Armagh Intermediate Football Championship (1)
1992
 Armagh Junior Football Championship (3)
 1942, 1960, 1986
 Armagh Junior All-County Football League (1)
 1938
 Armagh Under-21 Football Championship
 1990, 2017

References

Gaelic games clubs in County Armagh
Gaelic football clubs in County Armagh